The Lenong Regiment (formerly Regiment President Kruger) is a reserve motorised infantry regiment of the South African Army

History

Regiment President Kruger was raised in 1954 as a motorised infantry unit and was initially headquartered in Krugersdorp.

Name change
By 1960 the unit was renamed Regiment Wes Rand. This was however reverted by 1964.

In August 2019, 52 Reserve Force units had their names changed to reflect the diverse military history of South Africa. Regiment President Kruger became the Lenong Regiment, and have 3 years to design and implement new regimental insignia.

Garrison
The units HQ moved to Randfontein around 1972, about 20 kilometers away.

Freedom of Entry
The unit exercised its freedom of entry into Johannesburg on 9 November 2013 as part of the centenary celebrations of the City of Johannesburg with bayonets fixed, colours flying and drums beating.

Regimental colours
The units eagle symbol depicted the old Transvaal Republican era.

Previous dress insignia

Current dress insignia

Deployments and training
The regiment has been deployed as part of the SANDF throughout Africa, Burundi, DRC; in support of United Nations and African Union peacekeeping mandates. All members of the Regiment are volunteers, with employment in the civilian roles, they fulfil their responsibilities and duties on top of their duties and responsibilities to their families and employers.

Leadership

Honorary Colonel
 Colonel Jacques Jean-Marie Julienne (2012)

References

External links

Infantry regiments of South Africa
Military units and formations in the West Rand
Military units and formations of the Cold War
Military units and formations of South Africa in the Border War
Military units and formations established in 1954